In computer science, Java Grammatical Evolution is an implementation of grammatical evolution in the Java programming language. Examples include jGE library and GEVA.

jGE library 

jGE library was the first published implementation of grammatical evolution in the Java language. Today, another well-known published Java implementation exists, named GEVA. GEVA was developed at University College Dublin's Natural Computing Research & Applications group under the guidance of one of the inventors of grammatical evolution, Dr. Michael O'Neill.

jGE library aims to provide an implementation of grammatical evolution, as well as an open-source, extendable, and free framework for experimentation in the area of evolutionary computation. Namely, it supports the implementation (through additions and extensions) of any evolutionary algorithm. Its extendable architecture and design also facilitates the implementation and incorporation of new experimental implementation inspired by natural evolution and biology.

The jGE library binary file,  source code, documentation, and an extension for the NetLogo modeling environment, named jGE NetLogo extension, can be downloaded from the jGE Official Web Site.

License 
The jGE library is free software released under the GNU General Public License v3.

References

External links
 jGE Official Web Site

Genetic programming
Evolutionary algorithms